was the second of six s, built for the Imperial Japanese Navy under the Circle One Program (Maru Ichi Keikaku). Three were laid down in JFY 1931 and the next three in JFY 1933.

History
Construction of the advanced Hatsuharu-class destroyers was intended to give the Imperial Japanese Navy smaller and more economical destroyers than the previous  and  destroyers, but with essentially the same weaponry.  These conflicting goals proved beyond contemporary destroyer design, and the resulting ships were top-heavy design, with severe stability problems and with inherent structural weaknesses. After the "Tomozuru Incident" of 1934 and "IJN 4th Fleet Incident" in 1935, Nenohi underwent extensive modifications on completion to remedy these issues.
The Hatsuharu-class destroyers used the same 50 caliber 12.7 cm gun as the Fubuki class, but all turrets could elevate to 75° to give the main guns a minimal ability to engage aircraft .

The 61 cm Type 90 torpedo was mounted in triple-tube Type 90 Model 2 launchers. It was traversed by an electro-hydraulic system and could traverse 360° in twenty-five seconds. If the backup manual system was used, the time required increased to two minutes. Each tube could be reloaded in twenty-three seconds using the endless wire and winch provided.
Nenohi was laid down on 15 December 1931, launched on 22 December 1932 and commissioned on 30 September 1933.

Operational history
On completion, Nenohi was assigned to the IJN 2nd Expeditionary Fleet, and from 1940, she was assigned to patrol and cover landings of Japanese forces during the Invasion of French Indochina. She was docked at Hanoi during the initial stages of the operation to act as a radio station to coordinate wireless communications during the invasion, and was later based at Haiphong as a guard ship.

World War II history
From the end of January 1942, she deployed with the invasion force for the Netherlands East Indies, covering landing operations at Kendari on Sulawesi as part of "Operation H" on 24 January, Makassar on 8 February, and Bali and Lombok on 18 February. She returned to Sasebo Naval Arsenal at the end of March for maintenance.

From May 1942, Nenohi was reassigned to northern operations, and deployed from Ōminato Guard District as part of "Operation AL" in support of Admiral Boshiro Hosogaya’s Northern Force in the Aleutians campaign, patrolling around Attu, Kiska and Amchitka Island.
She capsized two minutes after being hit and sank in five minutes— 188 were killed, including Lieutenant Commander Terauchi; 38 survivors were rescued by the destroyer .

On 31 July 1942, Nenohi was removed from the navy list.

Notes

References

 OCLC 77257764

External links

Hatsuharu-class destroyers
Ships built by Uraga Dock Company
1932 ships
World War II destroyers of Japan
Ships sunk by American submarines
Shipwrecks in the Bering Sea
World War II shipwrecks in the Pacific Ocean
Ships of the Aleutian Islands campaign
Maritime incidents in July 1942